James Daniel "Denny" Despert (April 3, 1891 - June 1, 1931) was a Negro leagues outfielder  for several years before the founding of the first Negro National League. He had a short career in baseball after he lost his arm as a result of an injury he sustained while a passenger on a train August 19, 1916.

Despert claimed a hard object from a passing freight train was thrown at him, striking him on the arm. The injury was so severe it led to an amputation. Despert hired lawyers and sued the Washington, Philadelphia, and Baltimore Railroad company for $50,000, saying he could not play professional baseball and the injury left him weakened and in a crippled condition.

Despert lived to the age of 40 and died in Washington, DC.

References

External links

Philadelphia Giants players
Brooklyn Royal Giants players
1891 births
1931 deaths
20th-century African-American sportspeople